Feuerthalen railway station is a railway station in Feuerthalen, in the Swiss canton of Zürich. It is an intermediate stop on the Lake line and is served by local trains only.

Services 
Feuerthalen is served by the S1 of the St. Gallen S-Bahn:

 : half-hourly service between Schaffhausen and Wil via St. Gallen.

References

External links 
 
 

Railway stations in the canton of Zürich
Swiss Federal Railways stations